Fábio Silva (born March 31, 1982) is a Brazilian mixed martial artist currently competing in the light heavyweight division.

Mixed martial arts career

Early career
Turning professional is 2003, Silva amassed a record of 10 wins and 3 losses.

Hero's
Silva faced explosive striker Melvin Manhoef at Hero's 10 on September 17, 2007. Silva lost the fight via TKO at exactly 1 minute into the first round.

He then faced Yoon Dong-sik at Hero's 2007 in Korea on October 28, 2007. He lost the fight via armbar submission in the first round.

World Victory Road
Silva faced Kazuo Takahashi at World Victory Road Presents: Sengoku 3 on June 8, 2008. Silva won the fight via knockout due to a knee at 0:24 in the second round.

He then faced future Strikeforce light heavyweight champion Muhammed Lawal at World Victory Road Presents: Sengoku 6. He lost the fight via TKO due to punches in the third round.

Silva faced Ryo Kawamura at World Victory Road Presents: Sengoku 10 on September 23, 2009. He won the fight via TKO due to a corner stoppage at 2:28 in the first round.

Post-Sengoku
After a long hiatus, Silva returned and defeated Renan Fett via TKO in the second round to claim the Predador FC light heavyweight championship before losing to UFC veteran Luiz Cané via unanimous decision at Standout Fighting Tournament 2.

Championships and accomplishments
Predador Fight Championship
 Predador FC light heavyweight championship (one time, current)

Mixed martial arts record

|-
| Loss
| align=center| 13–9
| Carlos Eduardo 
| Decision (split)
| |ACB 73: Silva vs. Makoev 
| 
| align=center|3
| align=center|5:00
| Rio de Janeiro, Brazil
|
|-
| Loss
| align=center| 13–8
| Marcelo Alejandro Nuñez Sparling
| DQ (Illegal Strikes)
| Striker's House Cup 55
| 
| align=center|2
| align=center|1:32
| Curitiba, Brazil
|
|-
|Loss
|align=center|13–7
|Luiz Cané
|Decision (unanimous)
|Standout Fighting Tournament 2
|
|align=center|3
|align=center|5:00
|São Paulo, Brazil
|
|-
|Win
|align=center|13–6
|Renan Fett
|TKO (elbow and punches)
|Predador FC 24
|
|align=center|2
|align=center|3:58
|São Paulo, Brazil
|
|-
|Win
|align=center|12–6
|Ryo Kawamura
|TKO (corner stoppage)
|World Victory Road Presents: Sengoku 10
|
|align=center|1
|align=center|2:28
|Saitama, Japan
|
|-
|Loss
|align=center|11–6
|Muhammed Lawal
|TKO (punches)
|World Victory Road Presents: Sengoku 6
|
|align=center|3
|align=center|0:41
|Saitama, Japan
|
|-
|Win
|align=center|11–5
|Kazuo Takahashi
|KO (knee)
|World Victory Road Presents: Sengoku 3
|
|align=center|2
|align=center|0:24
|Saitama, Japan
|
|-
|Loss
|align=center|10–5
|Yoon Dong-sik
|Submission (armbar)
|Hero's 2007 in Korea
|
|align=center|1
|align=center|6:12
|Seoul, South Korea
|
|-
|Loss
|align=center|10–4
|Melvin Manhoef
|TKO (punches)
|Hero's 10
|
|align=center|1
|align=center|1:00
|Yokohama, Japan
|
|-
|Win
|align=center|10–3
|Claudio Cunha Godoy
|KO (knees)
|Predador FC 6: Octagon
|
|align=center|2
|align=center|0:08
|São Paulo, Brazil
|
|-
|Win
|align=center|9–3
|Ryo Kawamura
|KO (punches)
|Pancrase: Rising 5
|
|align=center|2
|align=center|3:44
|Tokyo, Japan
|
|-
|Win
|align=center|8–3
|Geno Vitale-Sansoti
|Decision (unanimous)
|Predador FC 5: Kamae
|
|align=center|3
|align=center|5:00
|São Paulo, Brazil
|
|-
|Loss
|align=center|7–3
|Leandro Gordo
|Decision (unanimous)
|Tsunamy 4
|
|align=center|3
|align=center|5:00
|Pelotas, Brazil
|
|-
|Win
|align=center|7–2
|Jorge Luis Bezerra
|Decision (unanimous)
|Storm Samurai 11
|
|align=center|3
|align=center|5:00
|Curitiba, Brazil
|
|-
|Win
|align=center|6–2
|Rafael Tatu
|Decision (unanimous)
|Meca 12: Meca World Vale Tudo 12
|
|align=center|3
|align=center|5:00
|Rio de Janeiro, Brazil
|
|-
|Win
|align=center|5–2
|Avallone Filho
|TKO (soccer kicks)
|Storm Samurai 7
|
|align=center|1
|align=center|3:52
|Curitiba, Brazil
|
|-
|Win
|align=center|4–2
|Divino Lopes
|Submission (guillotine choke)
|Shooto Brazil: New Generation
|
|align=center|1
|align=center|3:32
|Curitiba, Brazil
|
|-
|Win
|align=center|3–2
|Yuguem Toma
|KO (knee)
|Storm Samurai 4
|
|align=center|1
|align=center|N/A
|Brazil
|
|-
|Loss
|align=center|2–2
|Antonio Canudo
|Decision (unanimous)
|Real Fight 1
|
|align=center|3
|align=center|5:00
|Rio de Janeiro, Brazil
|
|-
|Loss
|align=center|2–1
|Jefferson Gaucho
|Decision (split)
|CO: Muay Thai & Vale Tudo
|
|align=center|3
|align=center|5:00
|Curitiba, Brazil
|
|-
|Win
|align=center|2–0
|Emerson Graxaim
|KO
|Storm Samurai 3
|
|align=center|2
|align=center|0:45
|Curitiba, Brazil
|
|-
|Win
|align=center|1–0
|Jefferson Gaucho
|TKO (doctor stoppage)
|Challenge Original Brazilian Vale Tudo 2
|
|align=center|1
|align=center|5:00
|Curitiba, Brazil
|

References

Living people
1982 births
Brazilian male mixed martial artists
Light heavyweight mixed martial artists
Mixed martial artists utilizing Brazilian jiu-jitsu
Brazilian practitioners of Brazilian jiu-jitsu